Bellefleur (French: Bellflower) may refer to:

Bellefleur, New Brunswick, a Canadian community
Bellefleur, a 1980 novel by Joyce Carol Oates
 Léon Bellefleur (1910–2007), a Canadian artist
Bellefleur family, characters in American TV series True Blood
Belle-Fleur apple, another name for the Bellflower apple